Alte Voce is a Corsican group, who sing Corsican music in the Corsican language.

History

The band was founded in November 2000 by Jean Mattei and Rosanna Cesari.
The group performs across France and in other countries of the world.

Discography 
 2004 : Lingua materna
 Polyphonies
 Endemicu
 Issa Terra
 Di sale e di zuccheru
 2010 : Petra Nostra
 2012 : Amore Umanu Dernier opus
 2019 : Isula Nostra

References

External links
 Official Website

Corsican musical groups